The 1910–11 Welsh Amateur Cup was the 21st season of the Welsh Amateur Cup. The cup was won by Buckley Engineers who defeated Aberystwyth 1-0 in the final at Newtown.

Preliminary round

First round

Second round

Third round

Fourth round

Semi-final

Final

References

1910-11
Welsh Cup
1910–11 domestic association football cups